Abatus is a genus of sea urchins belonging to the family Schizasteridae.

The species of this genus are found in Antarctica and southernmost America.

Species:

Abatus agassizii 
Abatus beatriceae 
Abatus cavernosus 
Abatus cordatus 
Abatus curvidens 
Abatus ingens 
Abatus kieri 
Abatus koehleri 
Abatus nimrodi 
Abatus philippii 
Abatus shackletoni

References

Echinoderms of South America
Schizasteridae
Echinoidea genera